Baxter, Vera Baxter is a 1977 French film directed by Marguerite Duras, based on her then-unpublished novel Vera Baxter ou les Plages de l'Atlantique.

External links
 

1977 films
1977 drama films
Films directed by Marguerite Duras
1970s French-language films
French drama films
1970s French films